Stainmore Railway Company is a volunteer-run, non-profit preservation company formed in 2000 with the aim of restoring Kirkby Stephen East railway station in Kirkby Stephen, Cumbria, England. In 1997 a company called Stainmore Properties Ltd. was formed, with the intention to convert KSE into an authentic North Eastern Railway focused heritage centre representing the early 1950s. The Stainmore Railway Company was subsequently formed to restore the site. Since then essential repairs have been made to the roof and station, a number of rooms have been restored and a short section of track has been laid along the formation of the old Eden Valley Railway, with some sidings and yard infrastructure within the station area and surroundings. A quantity of rolling stock that is authentic to the site has also been brought in.

The station was formerly on the South Durham & Lancashire Union Railway, and was also the eastern terminus of the Eden Valley Railway. The company has re-instated approximately a third of a mile of running line on the former Eden Valley Railway formation to allow train running. There is the eventual aim of joining up with the heritage Eden Valley Railway (at Warcop).

August 2011 marked the 150th anniversary of the railway. To commemorate this occasion a series of events were held during 2011, leading up to 'Stainmore 150', a large gala, where Steve Davis, the then-head of the National Railway Museum, drove the first fare-paying passenger train from the station in over 50 years, hauled by ex. Kirkby Stephen locomotive BR Standard Class 2 2-6-0 no. 78019. In 2013 the Stainmore Railway Company began its first operating season, running Peckett and Sons 0-4-0 'F C Tingey' on selected weekends. In 2014 this was joined by Yorkshire Engine Company 'Stanton 50' which operates diesel hauled trains on some weekends when there is no steam service.

In June 2017 it was announced that a joint Heritage Lottery Fund bid between the Stainmore Railway Company and the Locomotive Conservation and Learning Trust, to restore both LNER J21 65033 and an ex. North Eastern Railway stores van, no. 5523, as an interpretation vehicle to travel with the locomotive, had been successful. As part of the joint bid, it was agreed that, once restoration is completed, the locomotive will be based at Kirkby Stephen East and become the project's flagship locomotive. As a result of this, work is currently underway to create a vastly more flexible track layout within the station yard, as well as building a new restoration shed and authentic locomotive watering facilities. Part of the new work means that a short stretch of the former South Durham & Lancashire Union Railway formation across Bridge 149 has been re-instated.

Locomotives

Rolling stock

References

External links
Company website
Celebration of the 150th anniversary of the opening of the Stainmore line in August 2011
Details of project

Heritage railways in Cumbria